William Stewart (15 September 1883 – 9 August 1950) was a British cyclist. He competed in three events at the 1920 Summer Olympics winning a silver medal in the men's team pursuit. He also competed in one event at the 1924 Summer Olympics.

References

External links
 

1883 births
1950 deaths
British male cyclists
Olympic cyclists of Great Britain
Cyclists at the 1920 Summer Olympics
Cyclists at the 1924 Summer Olympics
Olympic silver medallists for Great Britain
Olympic medalists in cycling
Medalists at the 1920 Summer Olympics
Sportspeople from Moray
Scottish male cyclists
Scottish Olympic medallists